1995 is a French rap group founded in 2008 in the southern part of Paris as P.O.S. The name was changed to "1995" in 2010 in reference to the year 1995, considered a "golden year" for French rap. The six-member group is composed of 5 rappers and one producer all coming from the 14th and 15th arrondissements in Paris. 1995 are influenced by the spontaneous and positive vibes from the 1990 French rap.

The band name is pronounced in various formats like "Mille neuf cent quatre vingt quinze" or "Dix neuf quatre vingt quinze" or "un, neuf, neuf, cinq" or "un, double neuf, cinq". Despite offers for signing, the band has remained strongly independent  through their own "Undoubleneufcinq" label (meaning onedoubleninefive).

Members 
The 6 members of the group are:
Alpha Wann - aka Phaal or Philly Phaal
Areno Jaz - aka Jupiter Jaz or Darryl Zeuja
Fonky Flav' - aka Fonk'
Nekfeu - aka Nek le Fennek or Nekflamme
Sneazzy West - aka Sneaz' or Sneazzy
DJ Lo' - aka Lo' or Hologramme Lo'

The first five are rappers, whereas Lo' is a beatmaker and DJ. The rap group was established by Alpha Wann and Areno Jaz. Later on, it was expanded to include Nekfeu and Sneazzy (who went to the same school as Alpha Wann). Fonky Flav' was met through some Myspace postings and became the producer of 1995's materials.

Career 
After starting at rap competitions and open mic events in their various Paris and provincial venues, they realized the impact of the rap scene. They followed the  establishment of various other rap collectives, founders Alpha Wann and Areno Jaz decided to expand P.O.S (literally Porteur Officiel de Sac-à-dos / or Petite Organisation Scred) into a bigger formation paying tribute to the 1990s.

The band released "Dans ta réssoi" that garnered quickly more than 5  million views on YouTube followed by "Hi Haters". They became a constant presence in different battles including the famous Rap Contenders.

Their first EP containing 8 self-produced titles
entitled La Source was released in France in June 2011. It reached #23 in the SNEP French official charts., and #7 in downloads in its first week of release. Their Facebook attracted 130,000 followers. and their YouTube accumulated 12 million views.

Various members also release their own materials and projects like En Sous Marin EP by members Nekfeu and Alpha Wann, a net-EP by Sneazzy, or a mini-LP solo by Areno Jaz titled Alias Darryl Zeuja.

In March 2012, their second EP was released under the title La suite distributed by Universal Music Group in agreement with the band's label. The band embarked on a tour and series of appearances in music festivals to promote the album.

Paris Sud Minute the first album of the collective was released beginning of 2013. It was chosen as "Best Urban Music Album" during the Victoires de la musique the same year.

Discography

Albums

EPs

Singles

Solo projects of members
(name of member in parenthesis)
(for details and positions, see discographies of Alpha Wann, Lomepal, Nekfeu (including S-Crew), Sneazzy
2009 : Lowfficieux (Beatmaker : Hologram Lo', rappers : 1995 and other)
2010 : Même Signature (Nekfeu with his other band, S-Crew)
2011 : 5 Majeur (Nekfeu with his other band, 5 Majeur)
2011 : 925 (Beatmaker : DJ Lo' and other, with 3 songs which contains rap )
2011 : #Nothing (Sneazzy)
2011 : En sous-marin (Alpha Wann & Nekfeu)
2012 : Êtes vous prêts? (Sneazzy)
2012 : Alias Darryl Zeuja (Areno Jaz)
2012 : Métamorphose (Nekfeu with his other band, S-Crew)
2012 : Le singe fume sa cigarette (Beatmaker : Hologram Lo', rappers : Lomepal et Caballero)
2013 : Soleil d'hiver (Beatmaker : Hologram Lo', rapper : Georgio)
2013 : Seine Zoo (Nekfeu with his other band, S-Crew)
2013 : Variations (Nekfeu with his other band, 5 Majeur)
2013 : Rue Du Bon Son (Areno Jaz with his other band, X.L.R)
2014 : Alph Lauren (Alpha Wann)
2014 : Jeunes entrepreneurs (Nekfeu, Alpha Wann, Fonky Flav' with L'Entourage)
2014 : Deeplodocus (Hologram Lo')
2014 : InnerCity (Hologram Lo' et Darryl Zeuja)
2015 : Super (Sneazzy West)
2015 : Feu (Nekfeu)
2015 : Lexus (Hologram Lo')
2016 : Alph Lauren II (Alpha Wann & Hologram Lo')
2016 : Destin Liés (Nekfeu with S-Crew)
2016 : Jeep (Hologram Lo')
2016 : Dieu Benisse Supersound (Sneazzy)
2016 : Cyborg (Nekfeu)
2017 : Dieu Benisse Supersound II (Sneazzy)
2017 : Dieu Bénisse Supersound III (Sneazzy)
2018 : Alph Lauren III (Alpha Wann)
2018 : UMLA (Alpha Wann)
2019 : Les Étoiles vagabondes (Nekfeu)
2020 : Nouvo Mode (Sneazzy)
2020 : Chilladelphia (Darryl Zeuja)
2020 : Don Dada Mixtape Vol 1 (Alpha Wann)

Songs / Videos 
 2011 : "Flava In Ya Ear" (dir: Le Garage)
 2011 : "La Source" (dir: Le Garage)
 2011 : "La Flemme" (dir: Le Garage)
 2012 : "The Motto Remix" (dir: Le Garage)
 2012 : "La Suite" (dir: Le Garage / Syrine Boulanouar)
 2012 : "Renégats" (dir: Le Garage / Syrine Boulanouar & Rodolphe Lauga)
 2012 : "Bienvenüe" (dir: Kourtrajmé)
 2012 : "Flingue Dessus" (dir: Le Garage / Syrine Boulanouar)
 2012 : "Freestyle PSM" (dir: Le Garage)
 2012 : "Réel" (dir: Le Garage / Syrine Boulanouar)
 2012 : "Pétasse Blanche" (dir: Le Garage / Syrine Boulanouar)
 2012 : "Bla Bla Bla" (dir: Nicolas Davenel)

Nekfeu
 2014 : "Time B.O.M.B" - Nekfeu (dir: GVRCH et Clifto Cream)
 2014 : "Egérie" (dir: Dawid Krepski)

References 

French hip hop groups
Musical groups established in 2008
Rappers from Paris